Maharaja Chhatrasal Bundelkhand University (MCBU) is a state university in Chhatarpur, India. Dr. Priyavrat Shukla is appointed as first vice-chancellor.

Affiliated colleges
The institution affiliates the colleges of Chhatarpur district and other neighbouring districts like Damoh, Panna, Sagar, Tikamgarh and Niwari.

Campus
While the university campus is under construction, temporarily building has been allotted by Government Maharaja P.G. College of its Commerce Block for administration and affiliation purposes.

References

External links

Universities in Madhya Pradesh
Education in Chhatarpur
2015 establishments in Madhya Pradesh
Educational institutions established in 2015
Chhatarpur district